Mazhar-Ul-Haque Khan (23 February 1923 – 15 February 1997) was a Pakistani hurdler. He competed in the men's 110 metres hurdles at the 1948 Summer Olympics.

References

1923 births
1997 deaths
Athletes (track and field) at the 1948 Summer Olympics
Pakistani male hurdlers
Olympic athletes of Pakistan
Athletes from Uttar Pradesh